The multiball system in football permits a match immediately to resume with another ball when the original match ball goes out of play.

Traditionally, professional football matches employ the use of a single ball, and when the ball leaves the field of play, the game pauses until the ball is returned. According to the Laws of the Game, the ball may be changed on the "authority of the referee" if it "bursts or becomes defective", though typically it will also be replaced if kicked out of the stadium. However, a new system was introduced by some football leagues and associations to increase the number of match balls used per game. In the multiball system, a number of match balls, often seven, are held by ball boys around the edge of the pitch. When one ball leaves the field of play, the nearest ball boy will release another ball to a player, allowing the game to resume immediately. The system is currently used for UEFA European club tournaments, international competitions and the FIFA World Cup. Home teams are free to choose whether to use the system in the English Football League, though the referee may discontinue the system during a match.

Multiball system use

Criticism
While some commentators and managers support the system for maintaining the speed and flow of the game, others suggest that the way the system is implemented favours the home team. In 2005 Gary Megson, then manager of Nottingham Forest F.C., was cited in a referee's match report after his team scored, prompting "the supply of balls around the pitch to dry up". Ian Holloway claims that, when playing at other stadia, ball boys often delay providing balls to his players, but that "when it is the other way around the ball boys cannot get the ball to their own players fast enough".

References 
Footnotes

Citations

Association football terminology
Laws of association football